Richland Township is a township in Jewell County, Kansas, United States.  As of the 2000 census, its population was 36.

Geography
Richland Township covers an area of 35.81 square miles (92.75 square kilometers); of this, 3.63 square miles (9.4 square kilometers) or 10.13 percent is water. The streams of Johns Creek, Montana Creek and Taylor Creek run through this township.

Adjacent townships
 Montana Township (north)
 Jackson Township (northeast)
 Sinclair Township (east)
 Grant Township (southeast)
 Washington Township (south)
 Center Township (southwest)
 Holmwood Township (west)
 Harrison Township (northwest)

Cemeteries
The township contains one cemetery, Dahl.

Major highways
 K-14

References
 U.S. Board on Geographic Names (GNIS)
 United States Census Bureau cartographic boundary files

External links
 City-Data.com

Townships in Jewell County, Kansas
Townships in Kansas